Andrew Peter Allen (born 30 April 1988) is an Australian cook. He is notable for winning the fourth season of MasterChef Australia in 2012, and for being a judge on MasterChef Australia from 2020.

MasterChef Australia 

Allen won the fourth season of MasterChef Australia. After making it to the final, Allen beat fellow finalists Audra Morrice and Julia Taylor in a three-way contest. Facing only Taylor for the final two rounds, Allen won with a score of 76 to Taylor's 68.

Allen appeared in an episode of MasterChef Australia All-Stars in August 2012.

He returned in the eleventh season as a professional Secret Chef, and lost to Sandeep Pandit by a perfect score, 30, in an Immunity Pin Challenge. His score was kept secret, but was revealed on Facebook to be 24.

In October 2019, he was announced as one of three of the new MasterChef judges who will replace George Calombaris, Gary Mehigan and Matt Preston.

Personal life 
Allen was originally an electrician by occupation. He is also a basketball player with the Maitland Mustangs. He also volunteered to work on extensions to his local basketball stadium.

Allen's father Peter is a teacher at Bolwarra Public School, and was also the primary cricket convenor for the NSW Primary Schools Sports Association.

Career

Allen pursued a career in the hospitality. He now co-owns a restaurant, Three Blue Ducks, that has five locations around Australia, in Bronte, Rosebery and Byron Bay in NSW, as well as Brisbane and Melbourne. In 2018 his restaurant was awarded a Chefs Hat, making Allen the first MasterChef Australia contestant to be awarded the highly sought-after honour.

In 2021, he appeared as a co-host in Three Blue Ducks, a cooking show based on travelling throughout Australia to find inspiration for new dishes that will appear on the permanent restaurant menu.

References

Participants in Australian reality television series
Reality cooking competition winners
Living people
Australian television chefs
MasterChef Australia
1988 births
People from Maitland, New South Wales